The  was a 23.5 km railway line in Japan operated by Tobu Railway, which connected  on the Tōbu Kinugawa Line to  on the Tōhoku Main Line in Tochigi Prefecture. The line opened on 1 March 1924, and closed on 30 June 1959.

Operations
In its final years, there were just five trains in each direction daily, with only three in each direction running over the entire length of the line. Trains were mixed passenger and freight services hauled by 4-4-0 steam locomotives built by Beyer, Peacock & Company in England, with passenger cars converted from former Tobu electric multiple units.

History

On 1 May 1943, the line was bought by the Tobu Railway, becoming the Yaita Line.

The line closed on 30 June 1959.

See also
 List of railway lines in Japan

References
This article incorporates material from the corresponding article in the Japanese Wikipedia

Yaita Line
Rail transport in Tochigi Prefecture
Railway lines opened in 1924
Railway lines closed in 1959
1067 mm gauge railways in Japan
2 ft 6 in gauge railways in Japan
1924 establishments in Japan
1959 disestablishments in Japan